Henry George Pearce (April 21, 1886 – March 27, 1936) was an American cricketer. He was a fast bowler, who played cricket in Philadelphia during cricket's brief North American "golden age". He first played for the Philadelphian cricket team in first-class cricket on their three match tour of Jamaica in 1909. He returned to the side for the home two match series against Australia, and followed this up with a match for a combined Canada/USA team, also against Australia, which was to be his final first-class appearance. Across his seven first-class matches, he took 22 wickets at an average of 21.68 with a best of 7/57 against Australia.

References 
 
 

1886 births
1936 deaths
Philadelphian cricketers
American cricketers